Yidgha may refer to:

 Yidgha language, a language spoken in Chitral, Pakistan
 Yidgha people, the people who speak the language